Osgood Towns Hadley (January 19, 1838 – October 5, 1914) was a Union Army soldier in the American Civil War who received the U.S. military's highest decoration, the Medal of Honor.

Hadley was born in Nashua, New Hampshire on January 19, 1838. He married Susan F Carter (1841–1861) of Peterborough, New Hampshire on November 14, 1860. She died away September 17, 1861 and Hadley enlisted and was mustered into Federal service November 27, 1861, at Peterborough, New Hampshire.

He was awarded the Medal of Honor for extraordinary heroism on September 30, 1864, while serving as a Corporal with Company E, 6th New Hampshire Volunteer Infantry, at Pegram House, Virginia. Despite heavy enemy fire, Corporal Hadley retrieved and defended his colors and brought it back to his regiment. His Medal of Honor was issued, on July 27, 1896.

After returning to New Hampshire, he married  Sarah Naomi Ball (1848–1867) on September 22, 1865. Unfortunately, she died July 4, 1867. The twice widowed Hadley married a third time on November 25, 1868 to Lucy H. Brown Hadley (1845–1871). They had a son Willis Osgood Hadley (1870–1916) before she also died on January 15, 1871.

He died at the age of 76, on  October 5, 1914 having outlived three wives, and was buried at the Southborough Rural Cemetery  in Worcester County, Massachusetts. His son only survived him by two years dying at the Glencliffe Sanitorium from tuberculosis at age 45. However, his daughter-in-law and six grandchildren all lived lengthy lives into the second half of the twentieth century.

The Osgood T. Hadley Memorial Bridge in Southborough, Massachusetts is named in his honor.

Medal of Honor citation

Notes

References

External links
 Company C, 6th New Hampshire living history organization
 Company E, 6th New Hampshire living history organization

1838 births
1914 deaths
American Civil War recipients of the Medal of Honor
People from Nashua, New Hampshire
People of New Hampshire in the American Civil War
Union Army soldiers
United States Army Medal of Honor recipients